Hubert Hurkacz and Mate Pavić defeated Tim Pütz and Michael Venus in the final, 7–6(7–3), 7–6(7–5) to win the doubles tennis title at the 2022 Stuttgart Open.

Marcelo Demoliner and Santiago González were the defending champions, but chose not to defend their title.

Seeds

Draw

Draw

References

External links
Main draw

BOSS Open - Doubles
2022 Doubles